In molecular biology, immunophilins are endogenous cytosolic peptidyl-prolyl isomerases (PPI) that catalyze the interconversion between the cis and trans isomers of peptide bonds containing the amino acid proline (Pro). They are chaperone molecules that generally assist in the proper folding of diverse "client" proteins. Immunophilins are traditionally classified into two families that differ in sequence and biochemical characteristics. These two families are: "cyclosporin-binding cyclophilins (CyPs)" and "FK506-binding proteins (FKBPs)". In 2005, a group of dual-family immunophilins (DFI) has been discovered, mostly in unicellular organisms; these DFIs are natural chimera of CyP and FKBPs, fused in either order (CyP-FKBP or FKBP-CyP).

Immunophilins act as receptors for immunosuppressive drugs such as sirolimus (rapamycin), cyclosporin (such as CsA) and tacrolimus (FK506), which inhibit the prolyl isomerase activity of the immunophilins. The drug-immunophilin complexes (CsA-CyP and FK506-FKBP) bind to calcineurin, which inhibits the phosphatase activity of calcineurin and engenders the immunosuppressive effects. CsA and FK506 thus affect the calcium-dependent step of T cell response which prevents release of interleukin-2. Immunophilins also form protein complex with ryanodine and inositol triphosphate (IP3) which impacts the release of calcium.

FK506 binds with high affinity to other smaller proteins, such as FKBP-12. FKBP-12 and cyclophilins both share common peptide-prolyl isomerase activity. While the majority of the Peptide bonds within proteins exist in trans (planar) conformation because of the partial double-bond nature of the peptide bond, a small fraction occurs in cis. Unlike regular peptide bonds, the X-Pro peptide bond does not adopt the intended trans conformation spontaneously, thus, cis-trans isomerization can be the rate-limiting (slowest) step in the process of protein folding. Immunophilins, with their prolyl isomerase activity, thus function as protein-folding chaperones.

See also
 FKBP12
 FKBP 3 (FKBP25)
 FKBP4 (FKBP52)
 FKBP5 (FKBP51)

References

External links
 
 "Plant immunophilins and signal transduction" at berkeley.edu
http://www.jbc.org/content/280/26/24308.full

EC 5.2